The 89th Attack Squadron is a United States Air Force unit assigned to the 432d Wing as a tenant unit at Ellsworth Air Force Base, South Dakota.  It has been active as a remotely piloted aircraft (drone) squadron there since 2011.

The squadron was first activated as the 89th Aero Squadron at Kelly Field, Texas during World War I.  It deployed to France in 1917, where it constructed fields and trained observers,  In 1918 it briefly trained as an observation unit, but the unit did not move to the front before the Armistice.

It was consolidated in the mid 1930s with the 89th Observation Squadron as the 89th Reconnaissance Squadron but remained inactive until 1940, when it was attached to the 17th Bombardment Group at March Field, California and equipped with medium bombers.  In 1942 members of the squadron participated in the Doolittle Raid against Tokyo. The squadron, now named the 432d Bombardment Squadron, moved to the Mediterranean Theater of Operations and participated in combat until 1945, earning two Distinguished Unit Citations and the French Croix de Guerre with Palm before returning to the United States in late 1945 and being inactivated.

The 432d was reactivated as the 432d Attack Squadron in October 2011 at Ellsworth Air Force Base, South Dakota as a MQ-9 Reaper remotely piloted aircraft squadron.

Mission
The 89th Attack Squadron mission is to remotely employ MQ-9 Reaper aircraft from ground control facilities located at Ellsworth Air Force Base to support combatant commander requirements around the world.  The squadron, which operates the aircraft, and the Reaper ground control station are based at Ellsworth.  Its aircraft are deployed overseas, supporting continuing operations.

History

World War I

The first predecessor of the squadron was activated at Kelly Field, Texas as the 89th Aero Squadron on 19 August 1917. The men who formed the squadron had been inducted into the Army ten days earlier at Fort Logan, Colorado.  After processing, they departed for Kelly and upon arrival, formed the 89th and 88th Aero Squadrons and were trained on assembling new aircraft.  The squadron moved to the Aviation Concentration Center at Camp Mills, Garden City, New York in October to prepare for overseas movement.

The 89th arrived at the 1st Air Depot, American Expeditionary Force at Colombey-les-Belles Airdrome, France on 16 November where it began work on constructing facilities for the depot. In February 1918, the squadron moved to Châtillon-sur-Seine, where it began work on construction of a flying field for the 2d Corps Aeronautical School.  However, the squadron was quartered on a large farm some distance from the flying field, so construction of the field and supporting facilities took a month to complete and training of observers did not begin until May.

The squadron was assigned the first pilots to arrive at Chatillon and began training observers in artillery adjustment, photography, and gunnery.  A photographic detachment of squadron enlisted men developed the pictures taken by the students at the school.  These men formed the cadre for the 101st Photographic Section later in the year.

The 89th prepared for combat as an observation unit in July 1918, but never went to front, and in September all pilots assigned to the school were transferred to the headquarters of the Aeronautical School.  The squadron returned to the United States where it was demobilized in 1919.

In 1936 the 89th was consolidated on the inactive list with the 89th Observation Squadron.

World War II

The second predecessor of the 89th was constituted as the 89th Observation Squadron on the inactive list in 1935.  In October 1936, the two squadrons were consolidated as the 89th Reconnaissance Squadron, but remained inactive until 1940.  The squadron was activated and assigned to General Headquarters Air Force at March Field, California, but attached to the 17th Bombardment Group.   The squadron was reassigned to Northwest Air District in June 1940, with its primary mission being reconnaissance with a secondary mission of bombardment.   It was initially equipped with Douglas B-18 Bolos, but soon converted to Douglas B-23 Dragons.

In 1941, the squadron replaced its B-23s with North American B-25 Mitchells.  After Japan attack on Pearl Harbor, the 89th flew antisubmarine patrols off the Oregon and Washington coastline.

The 89th moved to Lexington County Airport, South Carolina in early 1942 to perform antisubmarine patrols over southeast Atlantic coast and the Gulf of Mexico.  There it became the fourth bombardment squadron of the 17th group as the 432d Bombardment Squadron.  Meanwhile, aircrews from the squadron trained with its B-25s at Hurlburt Field, Florida for the Doolittle Raid.  Some aircrews from the squadron participated in the raid, while the balance of the squadron transitioned into Martin B-26 Marauders, and completed training in Louisiana before being deployed to the Mediterranean Theater of Operations shortly following Operation Torch, the North Africa invasion.

During December 1942 the squadron became part of XII Bomber Command.  It engaged in combat operations over North Africa supporting American and later Allied ground forces in Tunisia.  The unit flew interdiction and close air support, bombing bridges, rail lines, marshalling yards, harbors, shipping, gun emplacements, troop concentrations and other enemy targets, helping defeat Axis forces in North Africa.

During 1943, the 432d participated in the reduction of Pantelleria.  It supported Operation Husky, the Allied invasion of Sicily and Operation Avalanche, the invasion of Italy.  During the drive toward Rome, the squadron was awarded a Distinguished Unit Citation for its attacks on airfields near Rome on 13 January 1944.  It was also awarded the French Croix de Guerre with Palm for its operations in Italy between April and June.

The unit provided tactical air support in the liberation of Sardinia and Corsica.  From airfields in Corsica, the 432d supported Allied ground forces during Operation Dragoon, the invasion of southern France in August 1944.  It moved to Southern France and bombed enemy targets during the Allied drive northward.  It earned a second Distinguished Unit Citation for bombing attacks on enemy defenses near Schweinfurt, Germany just before the end of the war on 10 April 1945.

The squadron remained in Europe after German capitulation.  It became part of the occupation forces, and participated in the disarmament of Germany after V-E Day.  It was assigned to the American Occupation Zone in Austria.    The squadron returned to France to stage for its return to the United States, where it was inactivated in late November 1945.

Remotely piloted aircraft operations
The squadron was activated in October 2011 at Ellsworth Air Force Base, South Dakota as an MQ-9 Reaper squadron.  The squadron replaced Detachment 1, 28th Operations Group, which had been activated in April 2011 to act as the lead organization to prepare Ellsworth for the activation of the remotely piloted aircraft unit.  The squadron was reassigned from the 28th Bomb Wing to the 432d Wing in October 2015 when the 28th Wing was reassigned to Air Force Global Strike Command.  The following June, the squadron returned to its original number and became the 89th Attack Squadron.

Lineage
89th Aero Squadron
 Organized as the 89th Aero Squadron on 19 August 1917
 Demobilized on 19 May 1919
 Reconstituted and consolidated on 24 October 1936 with the 89th Observation Squadron (Long Range, Light Bombardment as the 89th Reconnaissance Squadron

89th Attack Squadron
 Constituted as the 89th Observation Squadron (Long Range, Light Bombardment) on 1 March 1935
 Consolidated with the 89th Aero Squadron and redesignated 89th Reconnaissance Squadron on 24 October 1936 (remained inactive)
 Redesignated: 89th Reconnaissance Squadron (Medium Range) on 22 December 1939 (remained inactive)
 Activated on 1 February 1940
 Redesignated 89th Reconnaissance Squadron (Medium) on 20 November 1940
 Redesignated 432d Bombardment Squadron (Medium) on 22 April 1942
 Redesignated 432d Bombardment Squadron, Medium on 9 October 1944
 Inactivated on 26 November 1945
 Redesignated 432d Expeditionary Bomb Squadron and converted to provisional status on 16 January 2002
 Redesignated 432d Bomb Squadron and withdrawn from provisional status on 16 February 2007 (remained inactive)
 Redesignated 432d Attack Squadron on 1 September 2011
 Activated on 1 October 2011
 Redesignated 89th Attack Squadron on 21 June 2016

Assignments
 Unknown, 19 August 1917 – November 1917
 1st Air Depot, c. 6 November 1917
 2d Corps Aeronautical School, c. 17 February 1918 – c. 12 January 1919
 Unknown January – 19 May 1919
 Air Force Combat Command, 1 February 1940 (attached to 17th Bombardment Group)
 Northwest Air District (later 2d Air Force), June 1940 (remained attached to 17th Bombardment Group)
 17th Bombardment Group, 25 February 1942 – 26 November 1945
 Pacific Air Forces, to activate or inactivate any time between 2002 - 2007
 28th Operations Group: 1 October 2011 – 30 September 2015
 432d Operations Group: 1 October 2015 – present

Stations

 Kelly Field, Texas, 19 August 1917
 Camp Mills, New York, c. 6 October 1917 – 27 October 1917
 Colombey-les-Belles Airdrome, France, 16 November 1917
 Châtillon-sur-Seine, France, 17 February 1918
 Saint-Nazaire, France, c. 14 January 1919 – unknown
 Garden City, New York, c. 25 March 1919 – 19 May 1919
 March Field, California, 1 February 1940
 McChord Field, Washington, 26 June 1940
 Pendleton Field, Oregon, 29 June 1941
 McChord Field, Washington, c. 30 December 1941
 Pendleton Field, Oregon, c. 24 January 1942
 Lexington County Airport (later Columbia Army Air Base), South Carolina, 15 February 1942

 Barksdale Field, Louisiana, 22 June 1942 – 18 November 1942
 Telergma Airport, Algeria, c. 22 December 1942
 Sedrata Airfield, Algeria, c. 13 May 1943
 Djedeida Airfield, Tunisia, c. 25 June 1943
 Villacidro Airfield, Sardinia, Italy, 5 November 1943
 Poretta Airport, Corsica, France, c. 21 September 1944
 Dijon Air Base, France, 22 November 1944
 AAF Station Linz, Austria, c. 18 June 1945;
 Zell am See, Austria, 4 July 1945 (Ground echelon)
 Clastres Airfield, France, c. 3 October 1945 – c. 17 November 1945 (Ground echelon)
 Camp Myles Standish, Massachusetts, 25 November 1945 – 26 November 1945
 Ellsworth Air Force Base, South Dakota, 1 October 2011 – present

Aircraft
 Dorand AR and other types for training observers, 1918
 Breguet 14 when preparing for combat, 1918
 Douglas B-18 Bolo, 1940
 Douglas B-23 Dragon, 1940–1941
 North American B-25 Mitchell, 1941–1942
 Martin B-26 Marauder, 1942–1945
 General Atomics MQ-9 Reaper, 2011–present

Awards and Campaigns

See also

 List of American aero squadrons
 List of Martin B-26 Marauder operators

References

Notes

Bibliography

External links
  (Description of emblem and significance)
 
 
 

American Theater of World War II
Military units and formations in South Dakota
089